Glass Mask is a 2012 melodrama South Korean television series starring Seo Woo, Lee Ji-hoon, Park Jin-woo, and Kim Yoon-seo. It premiered on September 3, 2012 on tvN and aired on Mondays to Thursdays at 21:45 (KST) time slot.

Synopsis
The series follows Kang Yi-kyung, a woman whose father is a murderer. She must deal with tough times and also plot her revenge. To fulfill her revenge, she assumes another woman identity and comeback as Seo Jung-ha.

Cast

Main
Seo Woo as Kang Yi-kyung / Seo Jung-ha
Jung Da-bin as teen Yi-kyung
Lee Do-yun as child Jung-ha
Lee Ji-hoon as Kim Seon-jae
Park Jin-woo as Kim Ha-joon
Kim Yoon-seo as Kang Seo-yeon
Ahn Eun-jung as child Seo-yeon

Supporting
Yang Geum-seok as Jung Hye-ran
Jung Ae-ri as Shim Hae-soon
Kang Shin-il as Kang In-chil
Gi Ju-bong as Shin Ki-tae
Park Gun-rak as Seo Jung-pal
Yoon Park as Kang Gun
Lee Tae-woo as child Gun
Han In-soo as Director Seo Yong Bok
Lee Seul-bi as Kim Ha-ra / Seo Jung-ha 
Kim Kwang-young as Secretary Cha Hyun-tae
Kim Mi-ryeo as Ahm Mi-young
Kim Hee-jung as Kim Young-hee
Jung Ji-yeon as Hong Ji-soo
Jung Min-sung as Do Jin-wook
Yoon Seo-hyun as So Dae-young
Kim Jung-hak as Kim Joon-ho
Maeng Bong-hak as Yoo Min-ki

Extended
Park Ji-so as Ji Ni
Jang Joon-yoo as Yoo Nan
Jo Jae-ryong as Goo Bong-seo
Lee Jong-goo as Oh Il-hwan
Jun Jin-gi as Kim Do-shik
Lee Shin-ae as Han Na
Kim Tae-young as Dr. Yoon
Hong Seung-ho as Song Min-chul
Min Joo-hyun as Seoul Regional Tax Office Investigator

Cameo appearances
Yoo Jae-hyun as Financial Manager
Park Gyu-jum as Fidelli Director
Go Jin-myung as Fidelli Director
Kim Kwang-in as Fidelli Director
Jun Hun-tae as Police
Dan Kang-ho as Shin Ki-tae's Physician
Goo Bo-suk as Park Sung-bo
4th Floor as Bad Boys
Cilia Boes as Fidelli Designer
Park Shi-jin as In Ho
Kim Sung-ki
Chun Ye-won
Park Chan

OST

References

External links
 

TVN (South Korean TV channel) television dramas
2012 South Korean television series debuts
2013 South Korean television series endings
Television series about revenge
Korean-language television shows
South Korean melodrama television series
Television series by MBC C&I